Men Against the Sky is a 1940 drama directed by Leslie Goodwins and starring Richard Dix, Kent Taylor, Edmund Lowe and Wendy Barrie. Based on a story by John Twist, with a screenplay by novelist Nathanael West, the film is about aircraft development and the dangers of flying in the period before World War II.

Plot
Phil Mercedes (Richard Dix), once a record-setting pilot, is now an aging alcoholic. As an air show performer, while inebriated, he crashes his stunt aircraft into a barn and is grounded for a year. His sister Kay (Wendy Barrie), his only means of support, hopes to land a job in the drafting department for Martin Ames (Kent Taylor), the chief engineer for Dan McLean (Edmund Lowe), an aircraft manufacturer.

Given the war in Europe, the McLean company hopes to win a big contract with the government. Although Kay is not very skilled, she shows Ames some drawings Phil made. The creative designs interest Dan, who approves the construction of a high-speed fighter aircraft. Preliminary tests of the aircraft prove disastrous, with test pilot Dick Allerton (Donald Briggs) contending that the aircraft is too dangerous to fly.

With a redesign of the wings, Dick flies the experimental aircraft again, but the landing gear will not extend fully, leaving the test pilot circling the airport. If the aircraft cannot complete its tests, the company will be in danger of bankruptcy. Phil again takes over, successfully wrenching the gear down, but losing his life in the process. With the successful completion of the flight tests, the company is saved.

Cast

 Richard Dix as Phil Mercedes
 Kent Taylor as Martin Ames
 Edmund Lowe as Daniel M. "Dan" McLean
 Wendy Barrie as Kay Mercedes, aka Kay Green
 Granville Bates as Mr. Burdett

 Grant Withers as Mr. Grant
 Donald Briggs as Dick Allerton
 Charles Quigley as Flynn
 Selmer Jackson as Capt. Sanders
 Lee Bonnell as Capt. Wallen

Production

Novelist Nathanael West was involved in a number of B films in this period, including Men Against the Sky, but recognition of his work was short-lived. Along with his wife Eileen, he was killed in a car crash on December 22, 1940, when West (a notoriously bad driver) ran a stop sign in Southern California. Principal photography for Men Against the Sky took place from late May to June 15, 1940.

According to The Hollywood Reporter, Lucille Ball, considered Hollywood's B movie queen, was to play the female lead before Wendy Barrie came on board. Paul Mantz, noted movie stunt pilot, was the aviation consultant. Models were mostly used, but also notable is the use of footage of the experimental Hughes H-1 Racer during its trials.

Reception
Men Against the Sky was generally considered a popular entry in the aviation film genre, although not of the same caliber as Test Pilot (1938) or Men With Wings (1938), which explored the same subject. Bosley Crowther of The New York Times in a contemporary review, characterized Men Against the Sky as a "generally entertaining little action picture," although he criticized its "maudlin heroics," the storyline which was "routine and obvious" and the performances that were no better than "stock and pedestrian."

References

Notes

Citations

Bibliography

 Cowin, Hugh W. The Risk Takers, A Unique Pictorial Record 1908-1972: Racing & Record-setting Aircraft (Aviation Pioneer 2).  London: Osprey Aviation, 1999. .
 Wynne, H. Hugh. The Motion Picture Stunt Pilots and Hollywood's Classic Aviation Movies. Missoula, Montana: Pictorial Histories Publishing Co., 1987. .

External links
 
 
 

1940 films
1940 drama films
American aviation films
American black-and-white films
Films scored by Roy Webb
Films directed by Leslie Goodwins
RKO Pictures films
Films with screenplays by Nathanael West
American drama films
1940s English-language films
1940s American films